Alfred Brendel – Unpublished Live and Radio Performances 1968–2001 is a 2-CD compilation album of solo piano music selected by the performer Alfred Brendel. The album was released in 2007 and features music by the composers Ludwig van Beethoven, Frédéric Chopin, Felix Mendelssohn, and Ferruccio Busoni.

Critical reception
This album was reviewed by Peter Burwasser  in Fanfare. He points out that these selections do not represent career highlights, such as Brendel's recordings of Mozart and Schubert, rather they are "performances of music close to the artist’s heart that contain the spontaneity and warmth of the live music-making experience." He goes on to say that no one else plays the Diabelli Variations better than Brendel, and that this performance, "if a shade lower in temperature and energy than the 1988 studio version, is richer and more dynamically pointed." Regarding the Beethoven Piano Sonata No. 28, Op. 101: "I share the common criticism of Brendel that he can be too cool emotionally, but you could not ascribe that character to this jubilant performance. Here is Brendel at his glorious best, which is to say, about as good as it gets." He goes on to give the Mendelssohn Variations very high marks, and of the Busoni he says Brendel "finds the slithering dark corners of this fascinating material."

The album was also reviewed by Bryce Morrison in the Gramophone. Morrison says "here is Brendel at his greatest" presenting "the ultimate or definitive musical statement." He gives very high praise to the Beethoven Diabelli Variations and the Op. 101 Sonata, and says Brendel "declares his love of Busoni's austere genius in every bar of Elegies Nos. 3 and 6 while Mendelssohn's Variations sérieuses are given with unflagging musical energy." He goes on to say that Chopin's Andante spianato et Grande Polonaise brillante is "a delicious surprise, the Andante played with the most simple and refined eloquence, the Polonaise given with a gentle and idiosyncratic charm – the reverse of other more superficial, show-stopping performances."

Track listing
All tracks are BBC Radio recordings.

See also
Alfred Brendel discography
Great Pianists of the 20th Century – Alfred Brendel III

References

External links
 Alfred Brendels official web site. Accessed 20 November 2009.

2007 classical albums
2007 compilation albums
Alfred Brendel albums